The 2017–18 Pittsburgh Panthers men's basketball team represented the University of Pittsburgh during the 2017–18 NCAA Division I men's basketball season. The Panthers were led by second-year head coach Kevin Stallings and played their home games at the Petersen Events Center in Pittsburgh, Pennsylvania as members of the Atlantic Coast Conference.

The Panthers entered the season as one of the most inexperienced teams in NCAA Division I. ESPN's Andrea Adelson summed up the team's situation in a February 2018 piece: 

They finished with the worst season in program history, going 8–24 overall and 0–18 in ACC play, finishing dead last in the conference and losing in the first round of the ACC tournament to Notre Dame. On March 8, 2018, Pitt fired Stallings. On March 27, Pitt hired Duke assistant coach Jeff Capel as head coach.

Previous season
The Panthers finished the 2016–17 season 16–17, 4–14 in ACC play to finish in a tie for 13th place. They defeated Georgia Tech in the first round of the ACC tournament to advance to the second round where they lost to Virginia.

On January 24, 2017, Pitt lost by 55 points to Louisville, the team's worst loss since 1906.

Offseason

Departures

Incoming transfers

2017 recruiting class

Roster

}

Schedule and results

|-
!colspan=9 style=| Exhibition

|-
!colspan=9 style=| Non-conference regular season

|-
!colspan=9 style=| ACC regular season

|-
!colspan=9 style=| ACC Tournament

References

Pittsburgh Panthers men's basketball seasons
Pittsburgh
Pittsburgh
Pittsburgh